Federal league may refer to:

Federal League, a short-lived Baseball league
Federal League (OHSAA), a high school athletic conference in Ohio
Liga Federal, a small confederal state in what is now Argentina and Uruguay
Federal League, a fictitious ice hockey league from the film Slap Shot
Federal Prospects Hockey League, a low level hockey league based in the eastern United States
Federal Rugby League, a third-level Rugby league in Russia.

See also
Bundesliga (disambiguation), literally "Federal league", several sports leagues in German-speaking countries